In number theory, Gillies' conjecture is a conjecture about the distribution of prime divisors of Mersenne numbers and was made by Donald B. Gillies in a 1964 paper in which he also announced the discovery of three new Mersenne primes. The conjecture is a specialization of the prime number theorem and is a refinement of conjectures due to I. J. Good and Daniel Shanks. The conjecture remains an open problem: several papers give empirical support, but it disagrees with the widely accepted (but also open) Lenstra–Pomerance–Wagstaff conjecture.

The conjecture

He noted that his conjecture would imply that

Incompatibility with Lenstra–Pomerance–Wagstaff conjecture

The Lenstra–Pomerance–Wagstaff conjecture gives different values:

Asymptotically these values are about 11% smaller.

Results
While Gillie's conjecture remains open, several papers have added empirical support to its validity, including Ehrman's 1964 paper.

References

Conjectures
Unsolved problems in number theory
Hypotheses
Mersenne primes